The Cusseta Industrial High School, at 113 Sandy Rd. in Cusseta, Georgia, is a Rosenwald School which was listed on the National Register of Historic Places in 2011.

It was then owned by the Chattahoochee County Historic Preservation Society, Inc. which sponsored the nomination.

References

External links
Flickr pics

Rosenwald schools in Georgia (U.S. state)
Schools in Georgia (U.S. state)
National Register of Historic Places in Georgia (U.S. state)
Education in Chattahoochee County, Georgia
Historically segregated African-American schools in Georgia (U.S. state)